Vitaliy Shafar or Vitalii Shafar  (born 27 January 1982 in Lutsk) is a Ukrainian long-distance runner. At the 2012 Summer Olympics, he competed in the Men's marathon, finishing in 29th place. He finished fourth in the 2014 Boston Marathon and tenth at the 2015 Boston Marathon.

He set a personal best of 2:09:53 hours for the marathon at the 2014 Toronto Waterfront Marathon.

References

External links 

Ukrainian male long-distance runners
Ukrainian male marathon runners
Living people
Sportspeople from Lutsk
Olympic athletes of Ukraine
Athletes (track and field) at the 2012 Summer Olympics
1982 births
Olympic male marathon runners
Sportspeople from Volyn Oblast